Morgan Frederick Rielly  (born March 9, 1994) is a Canadian professional ice hockey defenceman and alternate captain for the Toronto Maple Leafs of the National Hockey League (NHL). He was drafted by the Maple Leafs in the first round, fifth overall, of the 2012 NHL Entry Draft. Before being drafted, Rielly played with the Moose Jaw Warriors of the Western Hockey League. He has represented Canada internationally on several occasions, most notably at the 2016 World Championship, where he won a gold medal.

Playing career

Amateur
Rielly was selected second overall by the Moose Jaw Warriors of the Western Hockey League (WHL) Bantam Draft in 2009. Before entering the WHL, Rielly played midget hockey for the Notre Dame Hounds in Wilcox, Saskatchewan. In his final season with the Hounds, Rielly was the top-scoring defenceman in the Saskatchewan Midget AAA Hockey League, with 55 points in 43 games. His team captured Canada's national midget championship. Rielly joined the Warriors for the 2010–11 WHL season, playing in 65 games and recording 28 points. Heading into the 2011–12 WHL season, Rielly was a highly ranked prospect for the 2012 NHL Entry Draft. He suffered a serious knee injury, a torn anterior cruciate ligament, causing him to miss most of the season. He returned for the tail end of the Warriors playoff run against the Edmonton Oil Kings. Despite the injury, Rielly still finished the season ranked fifth among North American skaters by the Central Scouting Bureau. Rielly was selected by the Toronto Maple Leafs in the first round, fifth overall, and he signed a contract with the club shortly before the 2012–13 NHL lockout. He spent the 2012–13 season with the Warriors, with a stint in January at the Toronto Maple Leafs training camp, but eventually was returned to finish the season in the WHL.

Professional
Rielly made his professional debut at the end of the 2012–13 season with the Toronto Marlies of the American Hockey League (AHL). At the start of the 2013–14 NHL season, Rielly made the Maple Leafs roster out of training camp. He made his NHL debut on October 5, 2013, against the Ottawa Senators. On December 16, 2013, Rielly scored his first NHL goal, against Stanley Cup winner Marc-André Fleury of the Pittsburgh Penguins.

Rielly recorded his first multigoal game with two goals against Cam Talbot of the New York Rangers on February 10, 2015.

Throughout the 2015–16 season, Rielly earned much praise from Maple Leafs head coach Mike Babcock, as well as other figures of management. In addition, he would see an increase in ice time, often appearing on the top pairing for the club. He also set career highs in multiple offensive categories such as goals, assists and points. Rielly signed a six-year, $30 million contract on April 13, 2016, carrying an average value of $5 million a season. Before the 2016–17 season, Rielly was named as one of the Maple Leafs' alternate captains, along with teammates Tyler Bozak, Leo Komarov, and Matt Hunwick. He had his first career four-point game (1 goal and 3 assists), on November 11, 2016, during a 6–3 win against the Philadelphia Flyers. He spent most of the 2016–17 season with rookie Nikita Zaitsev on the Leafs' shutdown defence pairing, and finished the season with 27 points in 76 games. Rielly was nominated for the Bill Masterton Trophy at the end of the 2016–17 season.

During the 2017–18 season, Rielly was injured in a game against the Philadelphia Flyers on January 19, 2018, and was placed on injured reserve on January 22. He was back in the Leafs' lineup on February 3, 2018, after missing six games. Despite his injury, Rielly and fellow defenceman Jake Gardiner became the first two Leafs defenceman to record at least 50 points in a season since Tomáš Kaberle and Bryan McCabe accomplished the feat in 2006–07. He ended the regular season with a career-high 46 assists and 52 points, tying Gardiner for the team points leader amongst Leafs defencemen, and helped propel the Leafs to their second consecutive playoff showing. Despite pushing the Boston Bruins to seven games, the Leafs lost the series in the first round, as Rielly finished the playoffs with five points.

During the 2018–19 season, on October 9, 2018, Rielly recorded a career-high four assists in a 7–4 win over the Dallas Stars, bringing him to ten points in his first four games, tying him for the NHL lead in points alongside teammate Auston Matthews. The following game, on October 11 against the Detroit Red Wings, Rielly passed Bobby Orr for most points by a defenceman in a team's first five games, with 12 points. By picking up an assist the next game, he established the longest season-opening point streak by a defenceman in franchise history. On October 14, Rielly was named as one of the NHL's 3 Stars of the Week for the first time in his career. He had an NHL-leading six assists, along with an overtime goal against the Chicago Blackhawks, during a four-game Maple Leafs win streak. He was named as the NHL's second star of the week for his accomplishments. On December 20, during a 6–1 Leafs win over the Florida Panthers, Rielly recorded his second four assist game of the season, becoming the first NHL defenceman that year to reach the 40-point mark. On December 24, Rielly was again named as the 2nd star in the NHL's 3 Stars of the Week. Rielly led the NHL with 3 goals, 6 assists, 9 goals and a +10 rating the previous week to propel the Maple Leafs to a perfect week and into second place in the overall League standings. On January 23, 2019, Rielly became the first Maple Leafs defenceman to post consecutive 50-point seasons since Tomáš Kaberle's 2005–06 and 2007–08 seasons. Rielly reached the 50-point mark while skating in his 49th personal game of 2018-19. Only three other Maple Leafs defencemen have reached the mark faster: Borje Salming (42 GP in 1976-77), Babe Pratt (44 GP in 1943-44), and Bryan McCabe (45 GP in 2005-06). He scored his 20th goal of the season on March 16, 2019, against the Ottawa Senators. With his 20th goal of the season, Rielly became the first Maple Leafs' defenceman to score 20 goals in a season since Al Iafrate in the 1989–90 season. Rielly ended the season with a career-high 20 goals, 52 assists, and 72 points, the first 70+ point season by a Maple Leafs' defenceman since Börje Salming in 1980. He was one of only three defencemen under 25 to score at least 50 points that season, along with Thomas Chabot and Jacob Trouba.

On October 29, 2021, Rielly signed an eight-year, $60 million extension with the Maple Leafs.

International play

Rielly represents Canada internationally. He started out in regional and age-group competitions. When he was representing Team Pacific at the 2011 World U-17 Hockey Challenge, Rielly scored two goals in five games and helped his team capture a bronze medal. Later that year, Rielly was part of Canada's gold medal winning squad at the 2011 Ivan Hlinka Memorial Tournament. Rielly's first experience at an International Ice Hockey Federation sanctioned event was the 2011 IIHF World U18 Championships, where he recorded two goals and one assist in seven games. Canada finished fourth at the tournament.

During the 2012–13 NHL lockout, Rielly was selected to represent Canada at the 2013 IIHF World U20 Championships, again finishing in fourth place. In 2016, Rielly was named to Canada's roster for the 2016 IIHF World Championship, where he was named one of Canada's most valuable players. Canada would go on to win the tournament with a 2–0 victory over Finland in the final. Throughout the tournament, Rielly recorded the most ice time of any player on Canada. For this accomplishment, he was named to the tournament All-Star team.

For the 2016 World Cup of Hockey, Rielly was placed on Team North America, a team of North American hockey players aged 23 or younger. Also on the team was future teammate Auston Matthews. In three games with Team North America, Rielly tallied two points (one goal and one assist). Team North America went 2–1–0 in the tournament, scoring ten goals and conceding eight, suffering elimination following Finland's loss to Russia.

Personal life
Growing up, Rielly was a fan of the Toronto Maple Leafs. His paternal family is from Hamilton, Ontario, and are fans of the Maple Leafs. His mother, Shirley, is a cancer researcher and owns a medical company. He has an older brother, Connor. The family owns a lab named Maggie.

Until September 2015, Rielly and teammate Jake Gardiner were roommates. Despite parting ways, the two remained friends and Rielly was a groomsman at Gardiner's wedding.

Rielly is engaged to Canadian Olympic gold medalist ice dancer Tessa Virtue.

Career statistics

Regular season and playoffs

International

Awards and honours

References

External links

 

1994 births
Living people
Canadian ice hockey defencemen
Moose Jaw Warriors players
National Hockey League first-round draft picks
Notre Dame Hounds players
Ice hockey people from Vancouver
Toronto Maple Leafs draft picks
Toronto Maple Leafs players
Toronto Marlies players